The 2021–22 Saint Louis Billikens men's basketball team represented Saint Louis University during the 2021–22 NCAA Division I men's basketball season. Their head coach is Travis Ford in his sixth season at Saint Louis. The team played their home games at Chaifetz Arena as a member of the Atlantic 10 Conference. They finished the season 23–12, 12–6 in A-10 Play to finish in fifth place. They defeated La Salle and St. Bonaventure to advance to the semifinals of the A-10 tournament where they lost to Davidson. They received an at-large bid to the National Invitation Tournament where they lost in the first round to Northern Iowa.

Previous season 
In a season limited due to the ongoing COVID-19 pandemic, the Billikens finished the 2020–21 season 14–7, 6–4 in A-10 play to finish in a tie fourth place. They defeated UMass in the quarterfinals of the A-10 tournament before losing to St. Bonaventure in the semifinals. They received an at-large bid of the National Invitation Tournament where they lost to Mississippi State in the first round.

Offseason

Departures

Incoming transfers

Recruiting classes

2021 recruiting class

2022 recruiting class

Preseason  
In a poll of the league's head coaches and select media members at the conference's media day, the Billikens were picked to finish in third place in the A-10. Javonte Perkins was selected Preseason First Team All-Conference selection while Yuri Collins is a Third Team Preseason honoree. In the preseason game against Rockhurst, Perkins suffered a torn anterior cruciate ligament (ACL) in his left knee and will miss the remainder of the 2021–22 season.

Roster

Schedule and results 

|-
!colspan=12 style=| Exhibition

|-
!colspan=12 style=| Regular season

|-
!colspan=12 style=| A-10 tournament

|-
!colspan=12 style=| NIT

Source

Rankings

*AP does not release post-NCAA Tournament rankings

References 

Saint Louis
Saint Louis Billikens men's basketball seasons
Saint Louis Billikens men's basketball
Saint Louis Billikens men's basketball
Saint Louis